Nothochalara sordida is a moth in the family Depressariidae, and the only species in the genus Nothochalara. It was described by Alexey Diakonoff in 1954. It is found in New Guinea.

References

Moths described in 1954
Stenomatinae